Vladimir Polyakov may refer to:
 Vladimir Polyakov (entrepreneur) (born 1953), Russian entrepreneur
 Vladimir Polyakov (high jumper) (born 1935), Soviet athlete
 Vladimir Polyakov (pole vaulter) (born 1960), Soviet athlete
 Vladimir Polyakov (rower) (born 1952), Soviet rower
 Vladimir Polyakov (diplomat), Soviet Ambassador to Egypt 1974–1981